Philippe Grandrieux (born 10 October 1954) is a French film director and screenwriter.

Life and career
Grandrieux was born in Saint-Étienne.  He studied film at the INSAS (Institut National Supérieur des Arts du Spectacle) in Belgium. He exhibited his first video work at Galerie Albert Baronian, Bruxelles. 
In the 1980s, he worked in collaboration with the French Institut National de l'Audiovisuel (INA) and the television channel La Sept/Arte where he helped develop new cinematographic forms and formats that called into question some basic principles of film writing: for instance, the conventions behind documentary, information and film essays. In 1990, he created the film research lab “Live” which produced one-hour-long sequences by Thierry Kuntzel, Robert Kramer and Robert Frank...

Since 2005, programs devoted to Grandrieux's features (Sombre, La Vie nouvelle, Un lac, Malgré la nuit), installations, documentary work and shorts have been presented all over the world.

2012 / 2013 Grandrieux was Visiting Fiction Film Professor at Harvard University (USA).

2022 Philippe Grandrieux writes Marcus, the screenplay for his next feature film, in collaboration with Jonathan Littell.

The premiere of his staging of Wagner's opera Tristan and Isold is scheduled for March 2023 at Opera Ballet Vlaanderen (Ghent).

Work

Grandrieux's work covers several cinematographic fields – TV experimentation, video art, research movie, film essay, documentary and museum exhibition. His uncompromised vision of Art, leads him to push the boundaries of the cinematographic fields he is working on. As a consequence, he is always producing an inventive and radical cinema. His full-feature movies, Sombre (Special Jury Prize at the Locarno Film Festival), La Vie Nouvelle (A New Life), Un Lac (Orizzonti - Special Jury Prize in Venice) and Malgré la nuit, are examples of Grandrieux's creativity in photography, sound and narration. Following the work of Teinosuke Kinugasa, Jean Epstein and Pier Paolo Pasolini who were constantly looking for and inventing new narrative forms that would only fit films, Grandrieux's films, deriving from horror movies and experimental movies, give the viewer intense sensorial experiences. His goal is to make the viewer psychologically involved in his movies. Its films actually express a whole world of energies based on sensations and affects despite a linear narration and an iconography that relies on archetypes that refer to the archaic images of the fairy tale and the legend. Tim Palmer situates Grandrieux's work within an ongoing tendency of a cinema of the body, linked to other filmmakers such as Marina de Van, Diane Bertrand, Damien Odoul.

For his soundtrack, he worked with Alan Vega (on Sombre), with the musicians, poets and performers of the band Etant Donnés (on A New Life) and with Ferdinand Grandrieux (on Malgré la nuit).

The American actor Zachary Knighton played the main character with Anna Mouglalis. The writer Eric Vuillard also participated in the writing of the script of A New Life. A part of the email exchange between Grandrieux and Vuillard about the script has been published in the French film review Trafic.

Published also: "La Vie nouvelle/nouvelle Vision, à propos d'un film de Philippe Grandrieux," under the direction of Nicole Brenez, Paris, Ed. Léo Scheer, février 2005.
With texts from – Jonathan Rosenbaum, Raymond Bellour, Nicole Brenez, Sothean Nhieim, Fabien Gaffez, Serge Kaganski, Augustin Gimel, Lionel Soukaz, Adrian Martin, Vincent Amiel, Peter Tscherkassky...  
This book including a DVD of La Vie nouvelle.

The psychanalist Jean-Claude Polack declares about Grandrieux's movies that they “carefully try to understand the exact inner-working of one's psychic, and more especially the part that deals with desire and transformation. How does desire work? What are the elements that this energy-matter is using to expand its empire? What are the social repressions that desire has to face? Unlike Pasolini who is really interested in the way that society is theatrically transforming the ceremony of predating into a show, there is here an experimental cinema; it is true; that is trying to register, thanks to the camera, what humans eyes would never be able to see in order to deconstruct and analyze reality. Grandrieux's films are analytical films, like a microscope, that give the viewer the possibility to see more accurately what is movement, emotion, sensation, colour, darkness and the emergence of the image (either material or thought). What is the process that enables something to become an image in the dark? Why can this process only be seen as a threat?”

In 2006, Grandrieux appeared in Sarah Bertrand's documentary There is no direction.

In 2007, the singer Marilyn Manson, who admits having seen La Vie nouvelle several times, asked Grandrieux to direct his video-clip for his song Putting Holes in Happiness that belongs to the album Eat Me, Drink Me.

In 2008, Japan paid homage to Grandrieux's work, thanks to the French Ambassy, in the famous Uplink movie theater of Tokyo, under the title "Extreme Love - around Philippe Grandrieux".

The same year, the Tate Modern of London, along the retrospective "Paradise Now ! Essential French Avant-Garde cinema 1890-2008," played Putting Holes in Happiness, A New Life, The Late Season and an excerpt of Un Lac (A Lake), his latest movie, which was not completed back then.

Un Lac,  was ready for the 65th Venice Film Festival (2008) where he won a Special Mention in the Orrizzonti Section which rewards movies that initiate new cinematographic trends.

In 2011, his documentary It May Be That Beauty Has Strengthened Our Resolve - Masao Adachi (PG co-author of the project with Nicole Brenez) has been programmed in more than 35 festivals... and was awarded at: CPH:DOX Copenhagen International Documentary Film Festival / Denmark.
The NEW:VISION AWARD that aims at promoting the experimental documentary in the field between documentary and art was given to Philippe Grandrieux's documentary about the Japanese filmmaker Masao Adachi. The jury highlighted the film's interweaving of Adachi's aesthetic concerns with the social and political histories he lived through. 'Rather than a typical director/subject relationship, this is a collaboration between both directors, where authorship moves back and forth,' the jury's motivation said." The film wins also in 2012 the Best Documentary Prize in Pantin, France and in 2013 the Best Documentary Prize - Cultural Resistance in Tripoli, Lebanon.

In 2011, Philippe Grandrieux undertakes the production of a trilogy on the theme of bare life, in reference to the concept of Giorgio Agamben. In 2012, Philippe Grandrieux White Epilepsy and/or Meurtrière and/or Unrest has been programmed at FID Marseille, Underdox Munich, FNC Montréal within a retrospective devoted to Philippe Grandrieux with all his features, documentaries… and in 2013 at the IFFR Rotterdam, Lincoln Center New York, Ficunam Mexico then Istanbul, Lima, Edinburgh, Wroclaw... Between 2012 and 2016 this work (films and/or performances with dancers) is presented at Beaubourg Metz, the Whitney Museum of American Art, the CCN in Le Havre, the ICI-CCN in Montpellier, the University of Chicago as well as at the Radcliffe Institute for Advanced Study at Harvard University. 

In 2019 The Empty Gallery/Hong Kong presents all of this research, White Epilepsy, Meurtrière and Unrest, with a new piece The Scream produced and installed for this occasion and consisting of eleven projections.

His work has been influenced by the work of Edmond Bernhard, his teacher at the INSAS, Murnau, Robert Bresson, Straub–Huillet, Rainer Werner Fassbinder, Stan Brakhage and also by his readings of Marcus Aurelius, Spinoza and Gilles Deleuze's work.

Filmography
 1974 – Via la vidéo: installation ( Albert Baronian Gallery / Brussels)
 1975 – The Cubist Painting-La Peinture cubiste, co-directed by Thierry Kuntzel
 1982 – Just An Image-Juste une image 9x55', co-directed by Thierry Garrel, Louisette Neil
 1982 – A Generation-Une génération
 1983 – Full Moon-Pleine Lune (Prize of the French Association of Critics of Television)
 1984 – Full Size - Grandeur nature
 1985 – Long courrier: documentary
 1987 – The World is All What Happens-Le monde est tout ce qui arrive: documentary
 1987 – Azimut (4x30', with Paul Virilio, Jean-Louis Schefer, Juan David Nasio): documentary
 1990 – Live (14x60'), notably episodes by Robert Frank (New-York), Stephen Dwoskin (Londres), Nick Wapplington (near Newcastle), Robert Kramer (Berlin), Gary Hill (U.S.A), Thierry Kuntzel (Tampico), Daniele Incalcaterra (Moscou), Ken Kobland (Dallas)
 1993 – The Wheel - La Roue - Episodes "Brian Holm" and "Gert Jan Theunisse": documentary
 1994 – Jogo do Bicho: documentary
 1996 – Brut: documentary
 1996 – Back to Sarajevo: documentary
 1999 – Sombre: fiction (Special Mention of the Orrizzonti jury, Locarno Film Festival)
 2002 – La vie nouvelle: fiction
 2007 – Putting Holes in Happiness, video for Marilyn Manson
 2007 – Met: film and installation
 2007 – Late Season - L'Arrière-Saison, film and installation
 2007 – Grenoble: installation
 2008 – Un Lac: fiction (Orrizzonti Price/Special Mention 65th Venice Film Festival)
 2011 – Masao Adachi: documentary. First episode of the collection The Beauty May Have Strengthened Our Resoluteness (Nicole Brenez and Philippe Grandrieux dir.)      The film wins, the New:Vision Award in 2011 at CPH:DOX, Copenhagen, in 2012 the Best Documentary Prize in Pantin, France and in 2013 the Best Documentary Prize - Cultural Resistance in Tripoli, Lebanon 
 2012 – White Epilepsy: film and installation
 2015 – Meurtrière, film, performance and installation (Prix FNC LAB, Festival du Nouveau Cinéma de Montréal in 2015 - Mention spéciale, Festival FILMADRID in 2016) 
 2015 – Despite the Night: fiction
 2016 _ Unrest: film, performance and installation
 2018 _ The Scream: film and installation
 2018 _ La Lumière, la lumière: fiction. In the frame of Liminal including 4 films, from Lav Diaz, Manuel de Laborde, Oscar Enriquez and Philippe Grandrieux

Solo Retrospectives 

 2005 : « Philippe Grandrieux » États généraux du film documentaire, Lussas, France
 2007 : « Breathless, French New New Wave » Australian Cinémathèque, Gallery of Modern Art / Brisbane, Australie
 2008 : « Extreme Love, around Philippe Grandrieux » Uplink, Tokyo
 2008 : « Paradise Now ! Essential French Avant-Garde...» Tate Modern, Londres
 2009 : « Ciclo Philippe Grandrieux » International Film Festival of Guadalajara, Mexique
 2009 : « Ciclo Philippe Grandrieux » Cineteca Nacional, Mexico D.F.
 2009 : « Ciclo Philippe Grandrieux » Belo Horizonte et Sao Paulo, Brésil
 2009 : « Ciclo Philippe Grandrieux » International Film Festival of Cali, Colombie
 2009 : « All about Philippe Grandrieux » CPH :DOX International Film Festival of Copenhagen, Danemark
 2010 : « Film Comment Selects : Philippe Grandrieux » Lincoln Center, New-York, USA
 2010 : « Philippe Grandrieux » Harvard Film Archive / Cambridge, Massachuset, USA
 2010 : « Philippe Grandrieux » International Film Festival of Las Palmas, Espagne
 2011 : « World Cinema Now » Monach University / Melbourne, Australie
 2012 : « Philippe Grandrieux Artist in Focus » Courtisane / Gent, Belgique
 2012 : « Hommage » organisé par la revue Hors Champ et la Cinémathèque Québécoise, dans le cadre du Festival du nouveau cinéma, Montréal
 2013 : « Carte Blanche à Philippe Grandrieux » Whitney Museum of American Art, New-York, USA
 2016 : « Philippe Grandrieux Artist in Focus » 17th Jeonju IFF, Corée du Sud
 2017 : « Philippe Grandrieux » Milan
 2017 : « Philippe Grandrieux » Séville
 2017 : « Philippe Grandrieux » Thessalonique
 2017 : « Philippe Grandrieux » ACFK Uherské Hradiště, République tchèque
 2019 : « Cinéma d'Avant-garde : Philippe Grandrieux » Cinémathèque française

Bibliography 
 Bellour, Raymond, "Pour Sombre," Trafic, no. 28 (Winter 1998), P.O.L.
 ———. "Des corps renouvellés" Trafic  44 (Winter 2002), P.O.L.
 ———. "Le Futur antérieur" Trafic 70 (Summer 2009), P.O.L.
 Beugnet, Martine. Cinema and sensation: French film and the art of transgression, Edinburgh University Press, UK, 2007.
 Brenez, Nicole. "Jeune, dure et pure ! Une histoire du cinéma d'avant-garde et expérimental en France". Cinémathèque française/ Mazzotta, 2001.
 ———, ed. La Vie nouvelle/nouvelle Vision, à propos d'un film de Philippe Grandrieux, Léo Scheer, Paris, February 2005. With articles by Jonathan Rosenbaum, Raymond Bellour, Nicole Brenez, Sothean Nhieim, Fabien Gaffez, Serge Kaganski , Augustin Gimel, Lionel Soukaz, Adrian Martin, Vincent Amiel, Peter Tscherkassky.

 Blümlinger, Christa. "L'Au-delà des visages." Parachute 123 (2006).
 Martin, Adrian, "Unfinished diary" À propos de la projection de Un lac au festival de Las Palmas, Rouge, March/April 2009
 Rondeau, Corinne. "Sombre, la surface et la chair à propos d'un film de Philippe Grandrieux," Cinéma et inconscient, éditions Champs Vallon, France, 2001.

By Philippe Grandrieux
 Au bord d’un lac : Qu’est-ce que le réel ? Des cinéastes prennent position [archive], dir. Andréa Picard, ed. post-éditions / Cinéma du réel, 2018
 Rêverie d’un filmeur solitaire par Serge Kaganski : Les Inrockuptibles / 6-12 juillet 2016 n°1075
 Journal de tournage, Malgré la nuit (2èrme partie) : Trafic, n° 98, P.O.L., été 2016
 Journal de tournage, Malgré la nuit (1ère partie) : Mettray, ed. Didier Morin, septembre 2016
 Philippe Grandrieux à propos d’Ariane Labed : Possession Immédiate [archive], # 3, p 62. 2015
 La Première image, un texte écrit à l’occasion de la parution du n° 700 des Cahiers du cinéma, mai 2014
 Congo : Trafic n° 83, P.O.L., automne 2012
 Les Morts : Trafic n° 84, P.O.L., hiver 2012
 À quoi bon une image : Le cinéma critique, de l’argentique au numérique, voies et formes de l’objection visuelle [archive] : Publication de la Sorbonne, 2010
 Sous le ciel de Dwoskin : Trafic n° 76, ed. P.O.L., hiver 2010
 One Summer : Livraison n°4 [archive] Open Landscapes – Closed rooms, p. 174, 175, 186. 2009-2010
 Bad Lieutnant : un texte écrit à la demande de Nicole Brenez pour le livret de l’édition DVD de Bad Lieutnant d’Abel Ferrara, 2005
 Correspondance sur La Vie nouvelle, Philippe Grandrieux et Éric Vuillard, Trafic n° 44, P.O.L., hiver 2002
 L’Emprise : Trafic n° 38, ed. P.O.L., été 2001
 Sur l’horizon insensé du cinéma : Cahiers du cinéma, hors-série, novembre 2000
 Incendie : Trafic n° 16, ed. P.O.L., automne 199

Interviews
 Bonnaud, Frédéric. Les Inrockuptibles 183 (January–February 1999).
 Baecque, Antoine de and Thierry Jousse. Cahiers du cinéma 532 (February 1999).
 Baldassari, Lorenzo. Lo Specchio Scuro / (Fall 2015). philippe-grandrieux-intervista-grandrieux/ online
 ———. Lo Specchio Scuro (January 2016). online
 Béghin, Cyril, Stéphane Delorme and Mathias Lavin. Balthazar 4 (September 2000).
 Brenez, Nicole. Rouge / 2003, no. 1. online
 François, Elisabeth and Frédéric Bas. Chronic'Art (2002)
 Habib, André. Interview made during the retrospective of Philippe Grandrieux's work, organised by Hors champ during le festival du nouveau cinéma à Montréal (October 2012). online
 Goudet, Stéphane and Vassé, Claire. Positif 456 (February 1999).
 Kaganski, Serge and Bertrand Loutte. Les Inrockuptibles 366 (November–December 2002).
 Lipkes, Tatiana. "13 entrevitas a cineastas contemporaneos" ed. Mangos de Hacha, 2010
 Momcilovic, Jérôme Momcilovic. Chronic'Art 53 (2008)
 Morin, Didier. Mettray 1 (Winter 2009).
 Masotta, Cloe. Cinetranit (29 May 2010). online
 Sardes, Guillaume de. Prussian blue 4 (Spring 2013).

References

External links
 
 
 http://epilepticfilmbookmusic.com/

French film directors
French screenwriters
French experimental filmmakers
1954 births
Living people
People from Saint-Étienne